The Constitution (Amendment No. 22) Act 1933 (act no. 45 of 1933, previously bill no. 49 of 1933) was an Act of the Oireachtas of the Irish Free State amending the Constitution of the Irish Free State which had been adopted in 1922. It abolished the right of appeal from the Supreme Court of the Irish Free State to the Judicial Committee of the Privy Council. It was part of a series of constitutional changes the Fianna Fáil government led by Éamon de Valera had initiated after coming to office in 1932 which reduced the connections between the Irish Free State and the United Kingdom.

The major provisions of the Act were (a) abolishing the right of appeal to the Judicial Committee of the Privy Council (b) providing that it would not be lawful for any person to petition the Judicial Committee of the Privy Council against a decision of an Irish court and (c) applying the abolition retrospectively to existing judgments and appeals in being.

It amended Article 66 by the deletion of the words struck out below and insertion of the words emphasised in bold:

The Act became obsolete on the repeal of the 1922 Constitution on the adoption of the Constitution of Ireland in 1937, and was repealed by the Statute Law Revision Act 2016.

See also
 Judicial Committee of the Privy Council and the Irish Free State

References

1933 in Irish law
Acts of the Oireachtas of the 1930s
Amendments to the Constitution of the Irish Free State
Monarchy in the Irish Free State
Judicial Committee of the Privy Council cases from the Irish Free State